The canton of Valdahon is an administrative division of the Doubs department, eastern France. It was created at the French canton reorganisation which came into effect in March 2015. Its seat is in Valdahon.

It consists of the following communes:
 
Adam-lès-Vercel
Avoudrey
Battenans-Varin
Belleherbe
Belmont
Bremondans
Bretonvillers
Chamesey
Charmoille
Chaux-lès-Passavant
Chevigney-lès-Vercel
Consolation-Maisonnettes
Cour-Saint-Maurice
Courtetain-et-Salans
Domprel
Épenouse
Épenoy
Étalans
Étray
Eysson
Fallerans
Flangebouche
Fournets-Luisans
Fuans
Germéfontaine
Grandfontaine-sur-Creuse
La Grange
Guyans-Durnes
Guyans-Vennes
Landresse
Laviron
Longechaux
Longemaison
Longevelle-lès-Russey
Loray
Magny-Châtelard
Orchamps-Vennes
Orsans
Ouvans
Passonfontaine
Péseux
Pierrefontaine-les-Varans
Plaimbois-Vennes
Les Premiers-Sapins
Provenchère
Rosières-sur-Barbèche
Rosureux
La Sommette
Valdahon
Vaucluse
Vauclusotte
Vellerot-lès-Vercel
Vennes
Vercel-Villedieu-le-Camp
Vernierfontaine
Villers-Chief
Villers-la-Combe
Voires

References

Cantons of Doubs